Tenquille Mountain is a  summit located in the Pemberton Valley of British Columbia, Canada.

Description

Precipitation runoff from the mountain's slopes drains southwest into Wolverine Creek which is a tributary of the Lillooet River; northwest to Hurley River; northeast into Headquarters Creek and southeast into Tenquille Creek which are both tributaries of Birkenhead River. The mountain is on unceded territory of the Lil'wat and N'Quatqua, which is an important spiritual, cultural and food gathering area. The area surrounding Tenquille Lake is habitat for the South Chilcotin grizzly bear, black bear, mountain goat, wolverine, wolf, and deer. The mountain's name was recommended by mountaineer Karl Ricker in association with Tenquille Pass, which in turn was identified in Canadian Alpine Journal in 1936. The toponym was officially adopted January 23, 1979, by the Geographical Names Board of Canada.

Climate
Based on the Köppen climate classification, Tenquille Mountain is located in a subarctic climate zone of western North America. Most weather fronts originate in the Pacific Ocean, and travel east toward the Coast Mountains where they are forced upward by the range (Orographic lift), causing them to drop their moisture in the form of rain or snowfall. As a result, the Coast Mountains experience high precipitation, especially during the winter months in the form of snowfall. Winter temperatures can drop below −20 °C with wind chill factors below −30 °C. This climate supports an unnamed glacier on the northwest slope. The months July through September offer the most favorable weather for climbing Tenquille Mountain.

See also

 Geography of British Columbia

References

External links
 Weather: Tenquille Mountain 

Two-thousanders of British Columbia
Pacific Ranges
Lillooet Land District
Coast Mountains
Pemberton Valley